Mark Ian Hoyle (born 12 April 1987), better known by his online pseudonym LadBaby, is an English YouTuber, musician, and blogger. His content focuses on his experiences as a father and is usually filmed in collaboration with his wife, Roxanne. The couple have had the Christmas No. 1 on the UK Singles Chart every year from 2018 to 2022 with the novelty songs "We Built This City", "I Love Sausage Rolls", "Don't Stop Me Eatin'", "Sausage Rolls for Everyone", and "Food Aid". This made them the first musical act in British history to secure five Christmas No. 1 hits, surpassing the record set by the Beatles, who had four Christmas No. 1 songs in 1963, 1964, 1965, and 1967.

Career

Background and social media
Mark Ian Hoyle was born in Nottingham on 12 April 1987. He married Roxanne (née Messenger) in May 2015 after they eloped to Las Vegas. They reside in Nottingham and have two sons, Phoenix Forest (born 2016) and Kobe Notts (born 2018), with "Forest" being a reference to Nottingham Forest Football Club and "Notts" being a common nickname for both the city and football team. While Roxanne was pregnant with their first son, Mark created a blog named "LadBaby", reflecting the fact that he "was a lad and [he] was having a baby". He used the blog to document his day-to-day life as a first-time parent.

, the LadBaby YouTube channel, Facebook page, and Instagram account respectively have over 1 million subscribers, 4.9 million followers, and 1.3 million followers. LadBaby's video content, uploaded onto their Facebook and YouTube accounts, consists mainly of vlogs in which Mark demonstrates life hacks which help him to save money when faced with potentially costly parenting tasks. In June 2017, one vlog, in which he bought a toolbox from a hardware store to serve as a lunchbox for his son, went viral. Other creations by him include a baby walker made of pipes, a makeshift paddling pool made from a skip and a makeshift baby gate made from half of a door. Other viral videos include two uploaded in February 2018, when the Hoyle couple had each other's cars wrapped with love heart stickers and photographs of their faces. LadBaby is also known for the catchphrase "yes, mate!" which is often said in the videos. In October 2018, the Hoyles launched a spin-off YouTube channel, LadBaby & Sons, in which their sons take a more active role. The channel generally focuses on toy testing and kid-friendly social media challenges.

Charity singles
On 14 December 2018, the Hoyles released their charity single, a parody cover of Starship's 1985 single "We Built This City". The amended lyrics had a sausage roll theme with the refrain being changed to "We Built This City on Sausage Rolls". Proceeds from the charity single went to The Trussell Trust. The song debuted at number one on the UK Singles Chart, beating Ava Max's "Sweet but Psycho" and Ariana Grande's "Thank U, Next" to the 2018 Christmas number one, making the Hoyles the first British YouTubers to top the chart. It also appeared in Australia's ARIA Digital Track Chart and the US Hot Rock Songs chart peaking at No. 31 and No. 47 respectively.

On 13 December 2019, the Hoyle couple released a single entitled "I Love Sausage Rolls", a parody cover of Alan Merrill's "I Love Rock 'n' Roll". Nick Southwood co-wrote the new lyrics with the Hoyles, produced, mixed and performed bass and lead guitar. The single's cover is based on Abbey Road's cover. The song became the Christmas number one, beating the likes of Stormzy (No. 2), Lewis Capaldi (No. 3) and Dua Lipa (No. 4), and spent one week in the top 40. The couple were the third act to have two consecutive Christmas number one singles and the first to have two successive novelty Christmas number ones in the UK. On 27 December 2019, the record dropped from number 1 to number 57 and broke the record for the biggest ever drop from the top within the top 75 (as per The Guinness Book of British Hit Singles list, as "Three Lions" would have crashed out of the 'hit parade' by dropping to number 97 after it was number 1 in 2018). As with their previous single, proceeds went to The Trussell Trust. In a December 2019 interview with The Guardian, Hoyle declined to say who he had voted for at that month's general election; and when asked  whether a government that introduced austerity would do anything to mitigate the issue of food poverty, he said the incoming Conservative government were "the right people", and "I'm sure they're gonna do a great job."

On 13 December 2020, the couple announced their new Christmas single entitled "Don't Stop Me Eatin'", a parody cover of "Don't Stop Believin'" by Journey (which had got to number 2 in the UK charts when it was covered by the Glee Cast). In the United Kingdom, its rivals in the race for the Christmas Number One were Russ Abbott's "Atmosphere", former chart toppers Justin Bieber and The Lewisham & Greenwich NHS Choir (teaming up for a version of Bieber's "Holy") and Liam Gallagher's "All You're Dreaming Of". Again, LadBaby's parody version of "Don't Stop Believin'" had a sausage roll theme, with proceeds going to The Trussell Trust, whilst the design of the single's sleeve parodied Queen's Bohemian Rhapsody.

On 21 December 2020, LadBaby released an additional duet version of "Don't Stop Me Eatin'", which featured Ronan Keating performing the song with Roxanne. On 22 December 2020, James Masterton (the chart analyst for Music Week) reported that the single had sold over 116,000 copies so far, a total which included both the original and the version with Ronan.

On 25 December 2020, Katie Thistleton on BBC Radio 1 revealed it was the number one for Christmas 2020. It sold 158,000 to top the chart and 94% of its total figure came from paid-for sales (downloads and CDs rather than streams). It was the fastest-selling single in the UK charts since another charity record, "Bridge Over Troubled Water" by Artists For Grenfell, topped the chart in June 2017. LadBaby became the third act to secure three consecutive Christmas number ones and one of the few acts to top the chart with their first three singles.

On 1 January 2021, "Don't Stop Me Eatin'" dropped down the Official Chart Company's singles chart to number 78 and so became the first new track to drop out of the Top 75 ('hit parade') from number one. In doing so, it broke the record for the shortest stay in the 'hit parade' for a number one single (as in The Guinness Book of British Hit Singles list of Top 75 singles chart records) with only one week in the Top 75.

Christmas chart record
In December 2021, LadBaby announced they were trying to get a fourth consecutive festive No. 1 by releasing a new Christmas single featuring Elton John and Ed Sheeran. Unlike their other parodies, the new song "Sausage Rolls For Everyone" is based on a 2021 song, "Merry Christmas", which became a chart-topper for featured artists Ed Sheeran and Elton John on the Official Singles Chart Top 100 on 10 December 2021 (week ending date 16 December 2021). Again, LadBaby found the new record up against oldies from Wham! and Mariah Carey (both number one hits in the previous year), as well as singles by Adele and Gayle. In the same week, an acoustic version of "Sausage Rolls For Everyone" was released with The Food Bank Choir (rather than Sheeran and John). The acoustic version also came with a new video recorded at St Margaret's the Queen Church (as it is where the Norwood and Brixton Food Bank is located), featuring the Hoyles alongside stroke survivor Donna Kennedy and her 12-year-old son Ronan.

On 24 December 2021, LadBaby secured their fourth Christmas No. 1 in a row with a sales total of 136,445 (including 110,882 downloads and 4,898 CDs being sold), beating the original version of "Merry Christmas" by over 45,000 sales (with this number 2 getting a sales total of 90,508 in the end). On 31 December 2021, "Sausage Rolls For Everyone" was replaced at number one by the original "Merry Christmas", when it dropped to number 29 in the charts, managing a second week in the UK Top 40 and equalling the drop of 2015's "A Bridge over You" by the Lewisham and Greenwich NHS Choir, which once had the record-breaking fall from the top.

On 23 December, 2022, "Food Aid" debuted at #1 on the charts, marking LadBaby's fifth consecutive Christmas No. 1. 

LadBaby's Christmas song efforts have been challenged by some who have accused them of profiteering from poverty, most notably comedy act The Kunts.

Other ventures
In 2012, the couple took part in Channel 4's Hidden Talent. Trained by former champion freediver Emma Farrell, Roxanne was able to hold her breath underwater for four minutes and 18 seconds.

In June 2018, following an online public vote, Mark won Clas Ohlson's 2018 "Celebrity Dad of the Year" award, beating Prince William and others. Nine months later, Roxanne Hoyle won Clas Ohlson's 2019 "Celebrity Mum of the Year" award.

In November 2019, the Hoyle couple published a book titled Parenting for £1: ...And Other Baby Budget Hacks, in which they wrote about their life hacks.

In October 2020, Mark and Roxanne announced they had partnered with Walkers to create limited edition sausage roll-flavoured crisps, with five pence of the proceeds from each pack going to The Trussell Trust. In November 2020, the couple filmed a Walkers Christmas Ad.

In 2021, Roxanne released a collaboration clothing range with In the Style with most of the clothing aimed for mothers and women of all sizes. In July 2021, Roxanne and Mark released limited edition clothing for Euro 2020. In September 2021, the couple visited Greythorn Primary School, which Mark attended as a young child, to announce they had written a children's book, Greg the Sausage Roll: Santa's Little Helper, to be released in stores on 11 November 2021. They worked with Puffin Books, WHSmith, and the National Literacy Trust so that every time a book was pre-ordered or ordered from WH Smith, one book would be given to a child in the UK who does not have their own book. They also shared that they both have dyslexia. A couple of weeks later, Mark was nominated for a Pride of Britain Award for ITV Charity Fundraiser of the Year. In October 2021, Mark announced he was launching a Greg the Sausage Roll soft toy for Christmas. In November 2021, Mark and Roxanne began a book signing tour for Greg the Sausage Roll: Santa's Little Helper.

In November 2022, the couple released another book, Greg the Sausage Roll: The Perfect Present, which reached #1 on the Children's Bestseller List.

Discography

Singles

Notes

References

External links
 
 

1987 births
Living people
Comedy YouTubers
English YouTubers
People from Nottingham
People from Hemel Hempstead
English video bloggers
Prank YouTubers
YouTube channels launched in 2016
English-language YouTube channels
British male bloggers
English philanthropists
People with dyslexia